Stephen Van Culen White (August 1, 1831 – January 18, 1913) was a U.S. Representative from New York.

Early life and study
White was born in Chatham County, North Carolina. His mother, Julia Brewer, was a descendant of Oliver Cromwell and his father, Hiram White, was a local farmer. White moved to Illinois with his parents, who settled near Otterville. The region was largely a wilderness and White spent his childhood working as a trapper, selling animal skins to the American Fur Company.

He attended the first free integrated school in the United States, the Hamilton Primary School founded by Dr. Silas Hamilton in Otterville, and was graduated from Knox College in Galesburg, Illinois. In 1854 he entered a mercantile house in St. Louis, Missouri. White studied law and was admitted to the bar November 4, 1856.

Professional career
White moved to Des Moines, Iowa, in 1856, and practiced law until January 1, 1865, during which time he was Acting United States District Attorney for Iowa in 1864.

White moved to New York City in 1865 and engaged in banking, serving as member of the New York Stock Exchange.
He was an astronomer and upon the organization in 1883 of the American Astronomical Society was elected its first president.

Political career
White was elected as a Republican to the Fiftieth Congress (March 4, 1887 – March 3, 1889) from New York's 3rd congressional district. He was not a candidate for renomination in 1888 to the Fifty-first Congress.

White resumed the practice of law. He died in Brooklyn, New York, January 18, 1913 and was interred in Green-Wood Cemetery.

References

External links
 

1831 births
1913 deaths
Knox College (Illinois) alumni
Burials at Green-Wood Cemetery
People from Jersey County, Illinois
Republican Party members of the United States House of Representatives from New York (state)
19th-century American politicians